is a Japanese football player. He played for Japan national team.

Club career
Aoki was born in Takasaki on 28 September 1982. After graduating from high school, he joined J1 League club Kashima Antlers in 2001. He played as defensive midfielder from first season and Antlers won the champions in 2001 J1 League and 2002 J.League Cup. He became a regular player from 2003 season and played many matches for a long time. In 2007, Antlers won the champions in J1 League for the first time in 6 years and Emperor's Cup. Antlers won the champions in J1 League for 3 years in a row (2007-2009).

From 2010 season, although his opportunity to play as starting member decreased, Antlers won the champions 2010 Emperor's Cup, 2011 and 2012 J.League Cup. From 2012, he played many matches as center back. Antlers won the champions in 2015 J.League Cup. However he could hardly play in the match in 2016.

In July 2016, Aoki moved to Sagan Tosu. He played for the club in 2 seasons. In 2018, he moved to J2 League club Roasso Kumamoto. In 2019, he moved to Prefectural Leagues club Nankatsu SC.

National team career
In June 2001, Aoki was selected Japan U-20 national team for 2001 World Youth Championship. At this tournament, he played full time in all 3 matches as defensive midfielder.

He made his international debut for Japan on 20 August 2008 in a friendly against Uruguay at Sapporo Dome.

Club statistics

National team statistics

Appearances in major competitions

Team honors
A3 Champions Cup – 2003
J1 League – 2001, 2007, 2008, 2009
Emperor's Cup – 2007
J.League Cup – 2002
Japanese Super Cup – 2009

References

External links

 
 Japan National Football Team Database
 
 
Profile at Roasso Kumamoto

1982 births
Living people
Association football people from Gunma Prefecture
Japanese footballers
Japan youth international footballers
Japan international footballers
J1 League players
J2 League players
Kashima Antlers players
Sagan Tosu players
Roasso Kumamoto players
Asian Games medalists in football
Footballers at the 2002 Asian Games
Asian Games silver medalists for Japan
Medalists at the 2002 Asian Games
Association football defenders